Eastwood (Scottish Gaelic: A' Choille an Ear, Scots: Eastwid) is a civil parish which straddles Glasgow and East Renfrewshire in Scotland. The parish has had no administrative functions since 1930, but is still used for some statistical purposes. From 1975 until 1996 the name was also used for a local government district in the Strathclyde region. The district covered the part of Eastwood parish outside the city of Glasgow plus adjoining areas to the south. The district was abolished in 1996 to become part of East Renfrewshire.

Parish
The parish of Eastwood was historically entirely in Renfrewshire. The parish covered a large area south-west of Glasgow, including the settlements of Giffnock, Pollokshaws, and Thornliebank. There was no village called Eastwood as such; the name derives from the area formerly being the eastern woodlands controlled by Paisley Abbey. The original parish church of Eastwood was established sometime before 1265 and stood in a relatively isolated position on Thornliebank Road, immediately north-east of where Thornliebank railway station now stands.

The new church was on the edge of Pollokshaws, which had grown to become the largest settlement in the parish. The graveyard at the old church continued to be used, but the church building there was demolished shortly after the new church was built. The new church of 1781 was itself demolished and rebuilt in 1862–1863.

The parish was sometimes known by the alternative name of Pollok, a name which was later used for a housing estate laid out from the 1930s onwards in the north-western corner of the parish. Another housing estate was built after the Second World War immediately north-east of the site of Eastwood's pre-1781 parish church. This estate, centred on Garvock Drive, was named Eastwood after the parish.

Pollokshaws was made a burgh of barony in 1813. In 1891 the Shawlands area in the north of the parish was added to the burgh of Glasgow and county of Lanarkshire. The parish then straddled Renfrewshire and Lanarkshire. After Glasgow was made a county of itself in 1893 the parish instead straddled Renfrewshire and the county of the city of Glasgow. In 1912 the burgh of Pollokshaws and some adjoining areas from Eastwood parish were transferred into Glasgow. Glasgow's boundaries were extended again in 1926 to include more of Eastwood parish, including the neighbourhood called Eastwood adjoining the site of the pre-1781 church and the Mansewood area which had grown up around the new parish church.

The parish of Eastwood had a parish board from 1845 to 1894 and a parish council from 1894 to 1930. Parish councils were abolished in Scotland in 1930, with areas outside burghs being organised into larger landward districts. The First District of Renfrewshire was created covering the parishes of Eaglesham, Mearns, and the parts of the parishes of Cathcart and Eastwood that lay outside the city of Glasgow.

District
Local government across mainland Scotland was reorganised in 1975 under the Local Government (Scotland) Act 1973, which replaced the counties, burghs and landward districts with a two-tier system comprising upper-tier regions and lower-tier districts. Renfrewshire County Council and the First District Council were therefore abolished. Eastwood District was created covering the same area as the former First District. Eastwood was one of nineteen districts within the Strathclyde region.

The districts and regions were all abolished in 1996 under the Local Government etc. (Scotland) Act 1994. The area of Eastwood District was merged with the Barrhead electoral division from Renfrew District to become the East Renfrewshire council area.

Political control
The first election to the district council was held in 1974, initially operating as a shadow authority alongside the outgoing authorities until it came into its powers on 16 May 1975. Throughout the council's existence the Conservatives held a majority of the seats on the council:

Elections
Elections were held as follows:

Premises
The council was initially based at a converted house at 295 Fenwick Road in Giffnock. The building had previously served as the headquarters of the First District Council. The council built itself a new headquarters nearby in the grounds of Eastwood Park, moving into the new building in 1980. Following the council's abolition in 1996 the Eastwood Park building became the headquarters of the replacement East Renfrewshire Council.

Constituencies 

The Eastwood Westminster constituency was created in 1983, and the Eastwood Holyrood constituency, with the same boundaries, in 1999.

The Westminster constituency was renamed East Renfrewshire in 2005. The Holyrood constituency retains its original name.

See also 

 Subdivisions of Scotland

References

Districts of Scotland
East Renfrewshire
Civil parishes of Scotland
Giffnock
History of Renfrewshire
Newton Mearns
Clarkston, East Renfrewshire